Tentudía is a comarca in Badajoz, Extremadura, Spain.  It contains the following municipalities: Bienvenida, Bodonal de la Sierra, Cabeza la Vaca, Calera de León, Fuente de Cantos, Fuentes de León, Monesterio, Montemolín, and Segura de León.

References 

Comarcas of Extremadura
Province of Badajoz